Marco Giustiniani (died 23 April 1649) was a Roman Catholic prelate who served as Bishop of Verona (1631–1649), Bishop of Ceneda (1625–1631), and Bishop of Torcello (1625).

Biography
On 3 March 1625, Marco Giustiniani was appointed during the papacy of Pope Urban VIII as Bishop of Torcello. On 27 October 1625, he was appointed during the papacy of Pope Urban VIII as Bishop of Ceneda. On 7 April 1631, he was appointed during the papacy of Pope Urban VIII as Bishop of Verona. He served as Bishop of Verona until his death on 23 April 1649.

References

External links and additional sources
 (for Chronology of Bishops) 
 (for Chronology of Bishops) 
 (for Chronology of Bishops) 
 (for Chronology of Bishops) 
 (for Chronology of Bishops) 
 (for Chronology of Bishops) 

17th-century Roman Catholic bishops in the Republic of Venice
Bishops appointed by Pope Urban VIII
1631 deaths
Bishops of Verona
Marco